The Hand of Glory is a 2002 young adult novel by Sophie Masson. Set in Melbourne in the mid 19th century, it follows the stories of two young people: Sylvia Hoveden who has come from Britain to search for her brother, and Anje Otsoa who is searching for his parents' killer.

Background
The Hand of Glory was first published in Australia in July 2002 by Hodder Headline in trade paperback format. In 2004 it was published as an audiobook by Bolinda Publishing. The Hand of Glory won the 2002 Aurealis Award for best young-adult novel.

References

2002 Australian novels
Australian young adult novels
Australian alternative history novels
Children's historical novels
Novels set in Melbourne
Novels by Sophie Masson
Aurealis Award-winning works